Kazantsev (masculine) or Kazantseva (feminine) is a Russian surname.  It is shared by the following people:
Alexander Kazantsev, Soviet sci-fi writer
Artem Kazantsev (1988—2022), perpetrator of the Izhevsk school shooting
Kira Kazantsev (born 1991), American beauty pageant titleholder who won Miss America 2015

Viktor Kazantsev, Hero of the Russian Federation
Vladimir Kazantsev (athlete)
Vladimir Kazantsev (canoeist)

Russian-language surnames